New Dominion Pictures, LLC. (also registered as New Dominion Pictures Virginia Beach or New Dominion Pictures Virginia) is an American television production company based in Suffolk, Virginia and mainly specialized on producing documentary, reality, and non-fiction television programming and specials. New Dominion has produced programs for major TV networks including Discovery Channel, Destination America, The History Channel and National Geographic. The company was founded in 1989 by Tom Naughton who also served as the executive producer.

Television shows
 Paleoworld (1994-1997)
 The New Detectives: Case Studies in Forensic Science (1996-2005)
 Ghost Stories (1997-1998)
 The FBI Files (1998-2006)
 Daring Capers (1999-2002)
 Diagnosis: Unknown (2000-2002)
 The Prosecutors: In Pursuit of Justice (2000)
 Navy Seals: The Untold Stories (2001)
 Critical Rescue (2003)
 The Boys of H Company (2003)
 Interpol Investigates (2005)
 A Haunting (2005–present)
 FantomWorks (2013)

References

External links
 

Television production companies of the United States
Suffolk, Virginia
1989 establishments in Virginia